Lennox Lewis vs. Ray Mercer was a professional boxing match contested on May 10, 1996.

Background
Following victories over heavyweight contenders Lionel Butler and Tommy Morrison, Lennox Lewis was now regarded as the number one contender for the WBC Heavyweight Title, which was then held by Frank Bruno. However, the WBC chose to bypass Lewis and instead sanctioned a championship bout between Bruno and Mike Tyson, who had returned to boxing the previous year after serving over three years in prison. Lewis brought the matter to court, claiming that he, not Tyson, deserved to face Bruno for the WBC title, but he was unable to secure the match as the court ruled in favor of the Bruno–Tyson fight. As such, Lewis agreed to meet fellow 1988 Olympic Gold Medalist Ray Mercer in what was to be a tuneup fight for what was originally supposed to lead to a fight between Lewis and Riddick Bowe later in the year. 

The Lewis–Mercer fight was one of three high-profile fights put together for the return of boxing to Madison Square Garden. Also included on the card were Jorge Luis González vs. Tim Witherspoon and Evander Holyfield vs. Bobby Czyz.

The fight
Though Lewis entered the fight as the clear-cut favorite, Mercer surprised both Lewis and the audience by putting on one of the best performances in his career. From the opening bell, the two men would go back and forth, with Mercer being able to win two of the first three rounds on the scorecards. The two men would have arguably their most entertaining showing in the fourth. Lewis was able to hit Mercer with two impressive combination within the round's first two minutes, but with 40 second left in the round, Mercer was able to put on his best offensive showing in the fight as he hammered Lewis with a 16-punch combination that briefly stunned Lewis. Lewis then responded with a combination of his own, but Mercer was able to fight out it with another combination. The two continued to exchange close rounds with neither man gaining a knockdown and, by the end of the fight, both fighter's eyes were almost completely shut. One judge had the fight scored a draw at 95–95, the other two judge's had Lewis narrowly winning the fight with scores of 96–95 and 96–94, giving Lewis the victory by majority decision. When the decision was announced by Michael Buffer, the pro-Mercer crowd loudly booed, having felt Mercer had done enough to win the fight. The unofficial Associated Press scorecard had Mercer clearly winning the fight by the score of 97–93, while HBO's unofficial ringside scorer Harold Lederman scored the bout a draw 95–95. Despite giving up three inches to Lewis, Mercer was able to land 60% percent of his jabs to Lewis' 33%. Mercer also landed a higher percentage of total punches, 59% to Lewis' 44%. Lewis, however, was able to narrowly land more total punches, having landed 235 punches to Mercer's 223.

Aftermath
The Lewis-Bowe match never ended up taking place. In his tuneup fight against Andrew Golota, an out-of-shape former world champion performed poorly and only managed to win after Golota was disqualified for repeated shots below the belt. Lewis’ camp pulled out of the fight afterward as their interest in taking on Bowe faded. Lewis did not fight again in 1996, but in his next fight he got the title match he had been clamoring for; after Tyson vacated the WBC title to pursue a fight with WBA champion Bruce Seldon, Lewis fought and defeated Oliver McCall in a controversial fight for the vacant title, avenging his previous loss to McCall.

Undercard
Confirmed bouts:

Broadcasting

References

Mercer
1996 in boxing
1996 in sports in New York City
1990s in Manhattan
Boxing matches at Madison Square Garden
May 1996 sports events in the United States
Boxing on HBO